The Soviet Union's 1967 nuclear test series was a group of 17 nuclear tests conducted in 1967. These tests  followed the 1966 Soviet nuclear tests series and preceded the 1968 Soviet nuclear tests series.

References

1967
1967 in the Soviet Union
1967 in military history
Explosions in 1967